A low-carbon diet refers to making lifestyle choices related to food consumption to reduce resulting greenhouse gas emissions (GHGe). Choosing a low carbon diet is one facet of developing sustainable diets which increase the long-term sustainability of humanity.

It is estimated that the U.S. food system is responsible for at least 20 percent of U.S. greenhouse gases. This estimate may be low, as it counts only direct sources of GHGe. Indirect sources, such as demand for products from other countries, are often not counted. A low-carbon diet minimizes the emissions released from the production, packaging, processing, transport, preparation and waste of food. Major tenets of a low-carbon diet include eating less industrial meat and dairy, eating less industrially produced food in general, eating food grown locally and seasonally, eating less processed and packaged foods and reducing waste from food by proper portion size, recycling or composting.

Overall trends 

A 2014 study into the real-life diets of British people estimated their greenhouse gas footprints in terms of kilograms of carbon dioxide equivalent per day:

 7.19 for high meat-eaters (≥100 g/day)
 5.63 for medium meat-eaters (50–99 g/day)
 4.67 for low meat-eaters (<50 g/day)
 3.91 for fish-eaters
 3.81 for vegetarians
 2.89 for vegans

Background on diet and greenhouse gas emissions 
In the U.S., the food system emits four of the greenhouse gases associated with climate change: carbon dioxide, methane, nitrous oxide, and chlorofluorocarbons. The burning of fossil fuels (such as oil and gasoline) to power vehicles that transport food for long distances by air, ship, truck and rail releases carbon dioxide (CO2), the primary gas responsible for global warming. Chlorofluorocarbons (CFCs) are emitted from mechanical refrigerating and freezing mechanisms – both staples in food shipment and storage.  Anthropogenic methane emission sources include agriculture (ruminants, manure management, wetland rice production),  various other industries and landfills.  Anthropogenic nitrous oxide sources include fertilizer, manure, crop residues and nitrogen-fixing crops production.  Methane and nitrous oxide are also emitted in large amounts from natural sources.  The 100-year global warming potentials of methane and nitrous oxide are recently estimated at 25 and 298 carbon dioxide equivalents, respectively.

Steinfeld et al. estimate that livestock production accounts for 18 percent of anthropogenic GHG emissions expressed as carbon dioxide equivalents.   Of this amount, 34 percent is carbon dioxide emission from deforestation, principally in Central and South America, that they assigned to livestock production.  However, deforestation associated with livestock production is not an issue in many regions.  In the US, the land area occupied by forest increased between 1990 and 2009 and a net increase in forest land area was also reported in Canada.

Of emissions they attribute to livestock production, Steinfeld et al. estimate that globally, methane accounts for 30.2 percent. Like other greenhouse gases, methane contributes to global warming when its atmospheric concentration rises.  Although methane emission from agriculture and other anthropogenic sources has contributed substantially to past warming, it is of much less significance for current and recent warming. This is because there has been relatively little increase in atmospheric methane concentration in recent years  The anomalous increase in methane concentration in 2007, discussed by Rigby et al., has since been attributed principally to anomalous methane flux from natural wetlands, mostly in the tropics, rather than to anthropogenic sources.

Livestock sources (including enteric fermentation and manure) account for about 3.1 percent of US anthropogenic GHG emissions expressed as carbon dioxide equivalents.   This EPA estimate is based on methodologies agreed to by the Conference of Parties of the UNFCCC, with 100-year global warming potentials from the IPCC Second Assessment Report used in estimating GHG emissions as carbon dioxide equivalents.

A 2016 study published in Nature Climate Change concludes that climate taxes on meat and milk would simultaneously produce substantial cuts in greenhouse gas emissions and lead to healthier diets.  Such taxes would need to be designed with care: exempting and subsidising some food groups, selectively compensating for income loss, and using part of the revenue for health promotion.  The study analyzed surcharges of 40% on beef and 20% on milk and their effects on consumption, climate emissions, and distribution.  An optimum plan would reduce emissions by 1 billion tonnes per year – similar in amount to those from aviation globally.

High-carbon and low-carbon food choices 

Certain foods require more fossil fuel inputs than others, making it possible to go on a low-carbon diet and reduce one’s carbon footprint by choosing foods that need less fossil fuel and therefore emit less carbon dioxide and other greenhouse gases.

In June 2010, a report from United Nations Environment Programme declared that a global shift towards a vegan diet was needed to save the world from hunger, fuel shortages and climate change.

Cundiff and Harris write: "The American Dietetic Association (ADA) and Dietitians of Canada position paper officially recognizes that well-planned vegan and other vegetarian diets are appropriate for infancy and childhood."

China introduced new dietary guidelines in 2016 which aim to cut meat consumption by 50% and thereby reduce greenhouse gas emissions by 1 billion tonnes by 2030.

Industrial versus pastured livestock 

Beef and dairy cattle have extremely high levels of greenhouse gas emissions, due to methane emissions from enteric fermentation, and their very large land footprint.  Feed is a significant contributor to emissions from animals raised in Confined Animal Feeding Operations (CAFOs) or factory farms, as corn or soybeans must be fertilized, irrigated, processed into animal feed, packaged and then transported to the CAFO.  In 2005, CAFOs accounted for 74% of the world's poultry production, 50% of pork, 43% of beef, and 68% of eggs, according to the Worldwatch Institute.  Proportions are significantly higher in developed countries, but are growing rapidly in developing countries, where demand is also growing fast.  However, in the US, only about 11 percent of soybean acres and 14 percent of corn acres are irrigated; in contrast, about 66 percent of vegetable acres and 79 percent of orchard acres are irrigated.   In 1995, commercial fertilizer inputs averaged 11 pounds per acre for US soybean production, versus 157 pounds per acre for US potato production.  Soybean meal for livestock feed is commonly produced after extraction of soybean oil (used for cooking, food products, biodiesel, etc., so that only a fraction of processing is assignable to feed.  Such examples illustrate that issues relating to irrigation, fertilization and processing for meat production should also be of concern with regard to production of other foods.

In one study, grass-fed cattle were estimated to account for 40% less greenhouse emissions than CAFO cattle  However, comparative effects on emissions can vary.  in a US study, lower GHG emissions were associated with feedlot-finished beef production than with beef production on pasture and hay.  Similarly, a study in New Zealand concluded that environmental emissions per kilogram of beef produced can be reduced by incorporating feedlot finishing in a beef production system.  Another factor to be considered is the role of a healthy pastoral ecosystem in carbon sequestration.

Because CAFO production is highly centralised, the transport of animals to slaughter and then to distant retail outlets is a further source of greenhouse gas emissions.

In livestock production, emissions are reduced by feeding human-inedible materials that might otherwise by wasted.  Elferink et al.  state that "Currently, 70 % of the feedstock used in the Dutch feed industry originates from the food processing industry."  Among several US examples is the feeding of distillers grains remaining from biofuel production. For the marketing year 2009/2010, the amount of dried distillers grains used as livestock feed (and residual) in the US amounted to 25.0 million tonnes.

Distance traveled and method of transit 

Carbon emissions from transport account for 11% of the total carbon emissions of food, of which the transportation from producer to consumer accounts for 4%. However, "food miles" are a misleading measure; in many cases food imported from the other side of the world may have a lower carbon footprint than a locally produced equivalent, due to differences in farming methods. "Local food" campaigns may be motivated by protectionism rather than genuine environmentalism.

When looking at total greenhouse gases (not just carbon dioxide), 83% of emissions come from the actual production of the food because of the methane released by livestock and the nitrous oxide due to fertilizer.

The word locavore describes a person attempting to eat a diet consisting of foods harvested from within a 100-mile radius.

Some studies have criticized the emphasis on local food, claiming that it romanticizes local production, but does not produce very much environmental benefit. Transportation accounts for a relatively small portion of overall energy consumption in food production, and locally produced food may be much more energy intensive than food produced in a better area. Additionally the emphasis on "inefficient" local producers over more efficient ones further away may be damaging.

Processing, packaging and waste 
Highly processed foods such as granola bars come in individual packaging, demanding high energy inputs and resulting in packaging waste. These products contribute up to a third of total energy inputs for food consumption, as their ingredients are shipped from all over, processed, packaged, trucked to storage, then transported to retail outlets. Bottled water is another example of a highly packaged, wasteful food product. It is estimated that Americans throw away 40 million plastic water bottles every day, and bottled water is often shipped trans-continentally. Carbonated water must be chilled and kept under pressure during storage and transport so as to keep the carbon dioxide dissolved. This factor contributes greater energy usage for products shipped longer distances.

See also 

 Ethical eating
 Farm to fork
 List of diets
 Local food movement
 Sustainable food system
 The 100-Mile Diet
 Vertical farming
 Environmental vegetarianism

References

Additional sources 
 
 Miguel Llanos, "Plastic bottles pile up as mountains of waste," (2005), MSNBC

External links 

Diets
Environmental impact of agriculture
Food and the environment
Low-carbon economy
Sustainable food system
Climate change and agriculture